Gradsko is a small village in southeastern Bulgaria. It is situated in the Sliven Municipality of the Sliven Province. The population was 514 at the beginning of January, 2006.

Villages in Sliven Province